Spiderweb Software is an independent video game developer founded in 1994 by Jeff Vogel in Seattle, Washington. Its primary focus is on creating demoware games for the Apple Macintosh, Microsoft Windows, Android and the iPad. Spiderweb Software is also known for emphasizing storytelling and turn-based gameplay and using a retro style of graphics.

Games

Developed games

Spiderweb Software is most notable for the following RPG video games:
 The Exile trilogy of underground adventures (1995-1997).
 Blades of Exile, a non-canonical continuation featuring a scenario creation kit.
 Nethergate, a fantasy game based upon the Roman occupation of Britain (1998). The game was eventually revamped under the title Nethergate: Resurrection (2007).
 The first Avernum trilogy, which are expanded remakes of the Exile series, using the Nethergate game engine, with several enhancements to the visual design and gameplay (2000-2002).
 Blades of Avernum, a non-canonical continuation featuring a scenario creation kit.
 The five-part Geneforge series, notable for its unique gameplay involving the creation of creatures to assist the player (2001-2008).
 The Second Avernum trilogy, continuing and ultimately finishing the story of Avernum, using a variation of the Geneforge game engine (2005-2009).
 Avadon: The Black Fortress, the first game in a new trilogy (2011). Avadon features a new game setting, interface, and combat system.
 Avadon 2: The Corruption. The second game released in the Avadon trilogy (2013).
 Avadon 3: The Warborn. The third game released in the Avadon trilogy (2016).
 Avernum: Escape From the Pit (2011), Avernum 2: Crystal Souls (2015), and Avernum 3: Ruined World (2018), remakes of the first Avernum trilogy, with reworked game mechanics, and new graphics and sound effects.
 Queen's Wish: The Conqueror, the first game in a new fantasy series (2019). This series focuses on capturing and building fortresses and explores the mechanics and morality of building empires.
 Queen's Wish 2: The Tormentor. The second game released in the Queen's Wish trilogy. It was released on August 24, 2022.
 Geneforge 1 - Mutagen (2021) is a remake of the first Geneforge game. It was released on February 24, 2021.

Distributed games
The company previously provided distribution services and other support for other shareware developers, including Richard White and Crystal Shard. The games included:

 Galactic Core (developed by Richard White).
 Lost Souls (developed by Richard White).
 Ocean Bound (developed by Richard White).
 SubTerra (developed by Crystal Shard).
 Homeland: The Stone of Night (developed by Dragon Lore).

In June 2007, Jeff Vogel announced that the company would no longer be supporting games by other developers, and they are no longer available for download through Spiderweb's main site.

Awards
 Exile II: Crystal Souls – 1996 "Shareware Game of the Year" (Honorable Mention), 
 Exile III: Ruined World – "Shareware Game of the Year", 
 Nethergate – "RPG of the Year" (Honorable Mention), Computer Games Magazine
 Geneforge 4: Rebellion – "Indie RPG of the year" GameBanshee

References

External links
Spiderweb Software's official site
Jeff Vogel's Official Company and Gaming Blog

Video game companies of the United States
Video game development companies
Companies based in Seattle
Video game companies established in 1994
1994 establishments in Washington (state)